Kiliaen van Rensselaer (died February 22, 1687), was the patroon of Manor of Rensselaerswyck.

Life
Kiliaen van Rensselaer, who was born in Holland, was the eldest child of Johannes, and Elizabeth Van Twiller Van Rensselaer. When Kiliaen came of age, he travelled to Albany, and received naturalization papers from the English colonial government.

Manor of Rensselaerswyck
Upon the death of his uncle, Jeremias Van Rensselaer, in 1674, he became patroon of Rensselaerswyck. As he was still a minor the property was managed by his uncle, the Rev. Nicholas Van Rensselaer. Young Kiliaen's aunt, the widow of Jeremias, Maria Van Rensselaer, and her brother, Stephanus Van Cortlandt served in an advisory capacity.

While he was Patroon, the patroonship changed to an English lordship, and so was the first Lord of Rensselaerwyck.

Personal life
He married his cousin, Anna Van Rensselaer, daughter of Jeremias and Maria Van Cortlandt Van Rensselaer.

Death and succession
Kiliaen died without issue at Watervliet, Albany county, about February 22, 1687.  He was succeeded by his cousin and brother-in-law, Kiliaen van Rensselaer, son of Jeremias van Rensselaer.

References 
Notes

Sources

Kiliaen 4th patroon
Rensselaer, Kiliaen van
Rensselaer, Kiliaen van
Rensselaer, Kiliaen van